USS Onward II (SP-728), later USS SP-728, was an armed motorboat that served in the United States Navy as a patrol vessel from 1917 to 1918.

Onward II was built as a civilian motorboat of the same name by Defoe Boat and Motor Works at Bay City, Michigan. The U.S. Navy acquired her from her owner, W. S. Forsythe, on 23 June 1917 for World War I service as a patrol vessel and commissioned her on 25 June 1917 as USS Onward II (SP-728).

For the rest of World War I, Onward II performed routine harbor patrol duties at Newport, Rhode Island. In 1918 she was renamed USS SP-728.

SP-728 was returned to her owner on 2 December 1918.

Onward II should not be confused with the patrol vessel USS Onward (SP-311), in commission from 1917 to 1919.

References

Department of the Navy: Naval Historical Center: Online Library of Selected Images: Civilian Ships: Onward II (American Motor Boat, in service in 1917). Served as USS Onward II (SP-728) and USS SP-728 in 1917-1918
NavSource Online: Section Patrol Craft Photo Archive SP-728 ex-Onward II (SP 728)

Patrol vessels of the United States Navy
World War I patrol vessels of the United States
Ships built in Bay City, Michigan